Satya Narayan is a form of Vishnu, Satya Narayan (Hindu deity).

Satya Narayan is a common Indian name which may refer to:

B. Satya Narayan Reddy, Indian politician
Satya Narayan Bohidar, Sambalpuri writer
Satya Narayan Goenka, Burmese-Indian teacher of Vipassanā meditation 
Satya Narayan Sinha, Indian politician